Chile competed at the 2016 Summer Olympics in Rio de Janeiro, Brazil, from 5 to 21 August 2016. 

The Chilean Olympic Committee fielded a team of 42 athletes, 25 men and 17 women, to compete in sixteen sports at the Games. It was the nation's largest delegation sent to the Olympics without any association to the team-based sports for the first time. Nearly 25 percent of the Chilean team competed in the track and field, the largest by sport; there was only a single competitor in archery, equestrian, golf, judo, shooting, taekwondo, and triathlon.

The Chilean roster featured five sets of family members, including beach volleyball cousins Esteban and Marco Grimalt, race walking twins Edward and Yerko Araya, London 2012 yachtsman Benjamin Grez and his older brother Cristobal, and two other pairs of rookies sailing each other in the men's and women's 470 class, respectively: sisters Arantza and Begoña Gumucio and brothers Andrés and Francisco Ducasse. Fifteen Chilean athletes previously competed in London, with Laser sailor Matías del Solar and distance freestyle swimmer Kristel Köbrich headed to their fourth Olympics. Meanwhile, marathon runner Érika Olivera, who served as the nation's flag bearer at the opening ceremony, reached a historic milestone as the first Chilean female to compete in five Olympic Games. Other notable Chilean athletes included world-ranked triathlete Bárbara Riveros, artistic gymnast and London 2012 fourth-place finalist Tomás González, shot putter Natalia Duco, and 16-year-old archer Ricardo Soto.

For the second Olympics in a row, Chile failed to earn a single medal at the Games. Riveros, González, and weightlifter María Fernanda Valdés were the only athletes to achieve the most successful outcome for Chile in Rio de Janeiro, finishing among the top eight in their respective sporting events (fifth for Riveros and seventh each for González and Valdés).

Archery
 
One Chilean archer qualified for the men's individual recurve by securing one of three available Olympic spots at the Pan American Qualification Tournament in Medellín, Colombia.

Athletics (track and field)
 
Chilean athletes achieved qualifying standards in the following athletics events (up to a maximum of 3 athletes in each event):

Track & road events
Men

Women

Field events

Cycling

Road
Chile has qualified one rider in the men's Olympic road race by virtue of his top 20 individual ranking in the 2015 UCI America Tour. One additional spot was awarded to the Chilean cyclist in the women's road race by virtue of her top 100 individual placement in the 2016 UCI World Rankings.

Equestrian
 
Chile has entered one eventing rider into the Olympic equestrian competition by virtue of a top finish from Central & South America in the individual FEI Olympic rankings.

Eventing

Golf

Chile has entered one golfer into the Olympic tournament. Felipe Aguilar (world no. 248) qualified directly among the top 60 players for the men's singles based on the IGF World Rankings as of 11 July 2016.

Gymnastics

Artistic
Chile has entered two artistic gymnasts into the Olympic competition. London 2012 fourth-place finalist Tomás González and fellow Olympian Simona Castro had claimed their Olympic spots each in the men's and women's apparatus and all-around events, respectively, at the Olympic Test Event in Rio de Janeiro.

Men

Women

Judo

Chile has qualified one judoka for the men's middleweight category (90 kg) at the Games. Thomas Briceño earned a continental quota spot from the Pan American region as highest-ranked Chilean judoka outside of direct qualifying position in the IJF World Ranking List of 30 May 2016.

Rowing

Chile has qualified one boat each in the men's and women's lightweight double sculls, respectively, at the 2016 Latin American Continental Qualification Regatta in Valparaiso.

Qualification Legend: FA=Final A (medal); FB=Final B (non-medal); FC=Final C (non-medal); FD=Final D (non-medal); FE=Final E (non-medal); FF=Final F (non-medal); SA/B=Semifinals A/B; SC/D=Semifinals C/D; SE/F=Semifinals E/F; QF=Quarterfinals; R=Repechage

Sailing
 
Chilean sailors have qualified one boat in each of the following classes through the individual fleet World Championships, and South American qualifying regattas.

Men

Women

M = Medal race; EL = Eliminated – did not advance into the medal race

Shooting
 
Chile has qualified one shooter in the women's skeet by virtue of her best finish at the seventh stop of the 2015 ISSF World Cup series in Gabala, Azerbaijan.

Qualification Legend: Q = Qualify for the next round; q = Qualify for the bronze medal (shotgun)

Swimming

Chilean swimmers have so far achieved qualifying standards in the following events (up to a maximum of 2 swimmers in each event at the Olympic Qualifying Time (OQT), and potentially 1 at the Olympic Selection Time (OST)):

Taekwondo
 
Chile entered one athlete into the taekwondo competition at the Olympics. Ignacio Morales secured a spot in the men's lightweight category (68 kg) by virtue of his top two finish at the 2016 Pan American Qualification Tournament in Aguascalientes, Mexico.

Tennis

Chile has entered two tennis players into the Olympic tournament. Julio Peralta and Hans Podlipnik had claimed one of eight ITF Olympic men's doubles places, as Chile's top-ranked tennis pair outside of direct qualifying position in the ATP World Rankings as of 6 June 2016.

Triathlon
 
Chile has secured a quota in the women's triathlon event as a result of Barbara Riveros' triumph at the 2015 Pan American Games.

Volleyball

Beach
Chile men's beach volleyball team qualified directly for the Olympics by winning the final match over Venezuela at the 2016 CSV Continental Cup in Rosario, Argentina, signifying the nation's Olympic debut to the sport.

Weightlifting

Chile has qualified one female weightlifter for the Rio Olympics by virtue of a top four national finish at the 2016 Pan American Championships. Meanwhile, an unused men's Olympic spot was added to the Chilean weightlifting team by IWF, as a response to the vacancy of women's quota places in the individual World Rankings and to the "multiple positive cases" of doping on several nations. The team must allocate these places to individual athletes by 20 June 2016.

See also
Chile at the 2015 Pan American Games
Chile at the 2016 Winter Youth Olympics

References

External links 

 

Nations at the 2016 Summer Olympics
2016
2016 in Chilean sport